Fen is a British post-black metal band formed in 2006 from the Fens of East Anglia signed to the label Code666. Their Myspace page reports that they "draw the listener into a windswept and desolate landscape, bereft of hope". In 2006 they recorded the Ancient Sorrow EP (released on both CD and vinyl) and January 2009 saw the release of the first full-length album The Malediction Fields under the CODE666 record label. In 2011 they released the second studio album Epoch (also CODE666 records), gaining positive reviews in leading magazines Metal Hammer (8/10) and Terrorizer magazine (7.5/10). The album was launched at the Bull & Gate venue in London with support from Old Corpse Road on 11 February 2011.

Fen have played at many festivals and with many other acts, including at the Infernal Damnation Festival, the Damnation Festival 2010 (alongside acts such as Sabbat and Lawnmower Deth) the Aurora Infernalis Festival in 2012 (alongside Primordial) and tours (including international dates) with Negura Bunget, Wodensthrone and Agalloch.

Epoch was released in a standard jewel CD case and as a strictly limited artbook edition (limited to 799 copies) with 40 pages of photography from the landscapes that have inspired the music and two bonus tracks ("The Wind Whispers of Loss" and "...From the Mists").  A Waning Solace from Epoch featured in Terrorizer magazine's 10 essential anthems (Issue 208).  For this album the lineup featured original members The Watcher, Grungyn and Theutus with Æðelwalh previously of Wodensthrone on synths. Prior to Æðelwalh (in 2007) Draugluin had played synths with the band.

In 2012 Fen announced that their third album Dustwalker would be released on 21 January 2013 via Code 666 records, a launch show would follow in Camden on 15 February.  The lineup for this record would be a three piece featuring the Watcher, Grungyn and new drummer Derwydd.  To support the new album Fen announced a 28 date European tour alongside Agalloch.

Band members
Current members
 Frank "The Watcher" Allain – vocals, guitars (2006–present), synthesizers (2012–present)
 Adam "Grungyn" Allain – bass, vocals (2006–present)
 J.G - drums (2020–present)

Former members
 Daniel "Theutus" Spender – drums (2006–2012)
 Paul "Derwydd" Westwood – drums (2012–2016)
 Pete "Havenless" Aplin - drums (2016–2020)
 Draugluin – synths (2006–2011)
 Æðelwalh – synths (2011–2012)

Timeline

Discography
Studio albums
The Malediction Fields (2009)
Epoch (2011)
Dustwalker (2012)
Carrion Skies (2014)
Winter (2017)
The Dead Light (2019)

EPs
Ancient Sorrow (2007)
Onset of Winter (2008)

Split
Towards the Shores of the End (Fen / De Arma, 2011)
Call of Ashes II / Stone and Sea (Fen / Sleepwalker, 2016)

Others
Better Undead Than Alive 2 (Various artists, 2009)
Der Wanderer über dem Nebelmeer (Various artist, 2010)
Toteninsel (Various artists, 2012)
Önd - A Tribute (Various artists, 2012)

References and reviews

Releases - 
Epoch special edition https://web.archive.org/web/20110310163516/http://www.auralwebstore.com/store/product.php?id_product=452 
Epoch standard - https://web.archive.org/web/20110410074132/http://www.auralwebstore.com/store/product.php?id_product=451 
Malediction Fields - https://web.archive.org/web/20120320012622/http://www.auralwebstore.com/store/product.php?id_product=363 
Ancient Sorrow - https://web.archive.org/web/20120320012632/http://www.auralwebstore.com/store/product.php?id_product=444 
Towards the Shores of the End - https://web.archive.org/web/20110212194426/http://www.nordvis.eu/releases-1838529

Reviews of Epoch:
Ultimate Metal (collection of reviews) - http://www.ultimatemetal.com/forum/code666/645565-fen-epoch-reviews.html 
Metal Hammer Magazine - February 2011, page 119 - 2/5 of page review (8/10)
Terrorizer Magazine - Feb 2011 - Page 66, 7.5/10 
Trebuchet Magazine - http://www.trebuchet-magazine.com/index.php/site/article/fen_-_epoch/ 
Obscura - http://www.obscura.ws/fen-epoch/ 
Shellshock - http://www.shellshock.co.uk/product_info.php?selected_cat=CODE051&artist=Fen&Label_filter=Code666 
Rockfreaks review http://www.rockfreaks.net/index.php?page=albumreviews&id=3755 
My Metal Bin https://web.archive.org/web/20110822214226/http://mymetalbin.com/2011/02/14/fen-epoch-feb-11-2011/ 
Prog Sphere http://www.prog-sphere.com/2011/03/14/fen-epoch/ 
Blabbath - http://www.cackblabbath.co.uk/2010/12/02/fen-epoch/

Reviews of Malediction Fields
Metal Review: https://web.archive.org/web/20110228140430/http://metalreview.com/reviews/4878/fen-the-malediction-fields
Metal Crypt: http://www.metalcrypt.com/pages/review.php?revid=4688 
Metal Rage: http://www.metalrage.com/reviews/2685/fen-the-malediction-fields.html 
Ultimate Metal (collection of reviews): http://www.ultimatemetal.com/forum/code666/450876-fen-malediction-fields-reviews.html 
Chronicles of Chaos: http://www.chroniclesofchaos.com/reviews/albums/2-6026_fen_the_malediction_fields.aspx 
Blistering.com https://web.archive.org/web/20090322113109/http://www.blistering.com/fastpage/fpengine.php/link/1/templateid/15482/tempidx/4/menuid/2

Other reviews / sites
Terrorizer magazine feature (issue 208 April 2011) - Post Black Metakl report with picture, quote and interview with the Watcher from Fen - A Waning Solace featuring in the 10 essential metal anthems.
Full page feature in Metal Hammer (UK) magazine March 2011 page 110 "FEN: expansive brits redefine the black metal landscape" 
Terrorizer magazine March 2011 - 7.5 review of Towards the Shoes of the End 
Aural Music site - http://www.auralmusic.com/ 
De Arma Split Review http://halifaxcollect.blogspot.com/2011/02/fen-de-arma-towards-shores-of-end.html 
MTUK Metal Zine Review https://web.archive.org/web/20110722042748/http://www.metalteamuk.net/jan11reviews/cdreviews-fende.htm 
Sea of Tranquility Review: http://www.seaoftranquility.org/reviews.php?op=showcontent&id=10502 
Avant Garde Metal Review http://avantgarde-metal.com/content/reviews2.php?id=592 
Interview with The Watcher - https://web.archive.org/web/20110722042833/http://www.metalteamuk.net/interview-fen.htm 
Reverbnation page http://www.reverbnation.com/fenband 
LAST FM Page - http://www.last.fm/music/Fen

References

English black metal musical groups
Blackgaze musical groups